, now known by her married name , (born October 29, 1955 in Okayama City, Japan as ) is a Japanese actress who appeared in several Japanese martial arts films and samurai film and TV productions of the 1970s and 1980s.

Life and career
A skilled martial artist trained in Karate , Kenjitsu and Shorinji Kempo Etsuko was a member of Sonny Chiba's "Japan Action Club" (JAC) and appeared in several film and TV productions with Chiba, Hiroyuki Sanada, and other members of the JAC, including her big screen debut in Bodyguard Kiba 2 (1973), The Street Fighter (1974), Shorinji Kempo also known misleadingly as Killing Machine (1975), The Gorilla Seven TV series (1975), The Defensive Power of Aikido (1975), Shogun's Samurai (aka The Yagyu Clan Conspiracy) (1978), The Yagyu Conspiracy TV series (1978), Message from Space (1978), Shadow Warriors I-V TV series (1980-1985), Shogun's Ninja (1980), Roaring Fire (1982), and Legend of the Eight Samurai (1983).

Etsuko was also the lead in a number of films and TV series, starring in the Sister Street Fighter trilogy (1974-1975), The 13 Steps of Maki (1975), The Magnificent Chase (1975), Dragon Princess (1976), Lethal Woman: Fifth Level Fist (1976), the Yagyu Jubei Abaretabi TV series (1982-1983) where she reprised her role as Akane Yagyū alongside Sonny Chiba as Jūbei Yagyū from Shogun's Samurai (1978) and The Yagyu Conspiracy (1978), and The Second is a Christian (1985) an action comedy about a nun who becomes the successor to the head of a Yakuza group.

Along with her work in numerous contemporary martial arts and period samurai films and TV programs, Etsuko also appeared in tokusatsu superhero productions like Kikaider 01 (1973-1974) and Moonlight Mask (aka The Moon Mask Rider) (1981), investigative dramas such as Detective of Tomorrow (1977) and Detectives of Rumour: Tommy And Matsu (1979), fantasy films like Black Jack: The Visitor in the Eye (1977) and Exchange Students (1982), and mysteries like The Atami Murder Case (1986).

Etsuko also had a singing career from 1975 to 1984, although her last solo album, Three Dimension, was also released on CD in 1985. Two books were released relating to her in the 1970s and 1980s.

Etsuko met singer-actor Tsuyoshi Nagabuchi on the set of the Otoko wa Tsurai yo film Tora-san's Bluebird Fantasy (1986), when she was around 30 years old. She retired from acting after marrying him the following year, in 1987, when she was 31. Their daughter Ayane Nagabuchi is also an actress.

After her retirement, Etsuko stayed out of the limelight but returned to the public eye in 2011 with the release of her photography book Flower Arrangement INSPIRE and has been involved in charity work. She has written subsequent books on flower arrangement and made a number of public appearances, with the proceeds also being donated to charities.

Films

Television

Theater

Discography
Singles:

 13 Steps of Maki - 13階段のマキ (1975)
 Silhouette - 影法師 (1975)
 Saturday Night of Love - 恋のサタディー・ナイト (1977)
 Only Two at the Wedding - ふたりだけの結婚式 (1977)
 I dance like tomorrow - 明日よ風に舞え (1982)
 Airmail in the Southern Sands - 南のーー砂のエアメール (1984)

Albums:

 Female Killing Fist - Calling on Etsuko Shihomi!! - 女必殺拳 志穂美悦子参上!! (1976)
 Saturday Night of Love - 恋のサタディー・ナイト (1977)
 Three Dimension (1983) (also released on CD in 1985)

Books
 Shihomi Etsuko : Endless Road to action (1976)
 Actress : Shihomi Etsuko (1981)
 Flower Arrangement INSPIRE ～いちかばちか～ Vol.1 (2011)
 Flower Fighting INSPIRE ～いちかばちか～ Vol.2 (2012)
 Flower Arrangement Works INSPIRE 3 In New York'' (2013)

Notes

References

External links

Official site

1955 births
Living people
Japanese film actresses
Japanese female karateka
People from Okayama